A fuel ladder or ladder fuel is a firefighting term for live or dead vegetation that allows a fire to climb up from the landscape or forest floor into the tree canopy.  Common ladder fuels include tall grasses, shrubs, and tree branches, both living and dead.  The removal of fuel ladders is part of defensible space 'firescaping' practices.

Fire precautions
Potential fuel ladders should be removed to reduce the risk of fire bridging the gap to the canopy.  To remove the ladder requires pruning any low limbs up to a minimum of 8 feet, and potentially as high as 15 feet.  The required height depends on how low the branch tips hang, the steepness of slope, and the height and spacing of other nearby vegetation. 

The desired result is to create a situation in which a low-burning fire could burn to the trunk of a tree, which is protected by its bark, without having thinner, more flammable branches, leaves or needles within easy reach of the fire.

Other fuel ladders
Apart from tree limbs, anything that would help that fire move up into the tree canopy is a fuel ladder.  This includes shrubs and even tall grass or weeds. Non-vegetation fuel sources such as woodpiles, wooden fenceposts and structures should also be considered. 

The intent is to maintain a break in vertical and horizontal continuity so that, if for example a woodpile caught fire, it would not be positioned next to shrubs or directly under trees that could then easily catch fire.

See also
Fire control
Defensible space (fire control)
Fire ecology
Firefighting
Limbing
Wildfire
Wildfire suppression

References

External links
CAL-FIRE: Homepage + Links  Official CA State Board of Forestry and Fire Protection website.
CA State Board of Forestry and Fire Protection: "General Guidelines for Creating Defensible Space"
SBCFD Homepage + Links 'Defending Your Home and Hazard Reduction' - Official Santa Barbara County Fire Department Website
Santa Barbara County Fire Department: "Landscape 'Firescape' Checklist"
	

Wildfire suppression
Wildfire ecology
Sustainable forest management
Forest ecology
Environmental terminology
Gardening aids
Sustainable gardening
Wildfires